Sanjan or Sangan or Zangan may refer to:

Sanjan (Khorasan), a historic city in present-day Turkmenistan
Sanjan, Gujarat, a town in Gujarat state, India, named by Zoroastrian immigrants after the Sanjan in Khorasan
Sangan, Pakistan, a town in Balochistan province, Pakistan
Sangan-e Olya, a village in Qazvin province, Iran
Sangan-e Sofla, Qazvin, a village in Qazvin province, Iran
Sangan, Razavi Khorasan, a city in Razavi Khorasan province, Iran
Sangan-e Bala Khvaf, a village in Razavi Khorasan province, Iran
Sangan, South Khorasan, a village in South Khorasan province, Iran
Sangan, Chabahar, a village in Sistan and Baluchistan province
Sangan, Tehran, a village in Tehran province, Iran
Sengan, West Azerbaijan, a village in West Azerbaijan province, Iran
Zangan, West Azerbaijan, a village in West Azerbaijan province, Iran
Sangan District, a district in Razavi Khorasan province, Iran

Sanjan is also:
Qissa-i Sanjan, an account of the early years of Zoroastrian settlers in India
 the Sanskrit word for 'Creator', and thus the stock epithet of Brahma
 the Persian name for Xinjiang, China, which is part of historical Khorasan
 an area in the Loliondo Game Controlled Area in the eastern Serengeti in Tanzania

See also
Zanjan (disambiguation)